The Political Prisoner's Medal 1914–1918 was a Belgian medal established by royal decree on 26 December 1930 and awarded to Belgian civilians who were detained for a minimum of one month by the Germans during the First World War following an act of courage or devotion towards the Allies' cause.

Recipients of this medal automatically received the 1914–1918 Commemorative War Medal and the Inter-Allied Victory Medal 1914–1918.

Award description
The Political Prisoner's Medal 1914–1918 was identical to the King Albert Medal except for the ribbon. On the reverse of the central medallion, the relief inscription on four lines in French or in Dutch "IN TESTIMONY OF NATIONAL RECOGNITION" with the years "1914–1918" at the bottom.

Notable recipients (Partial list)
The individuals listed below were awarded the Political Prisoner's Medal:
 Aviator Major General Norbert Leboutte

See also

 List of Orders, Decorations and Medals of the Kingdom of Belgium

References

Other sources
 Quinot H., 1950, Recueil illustré des décorations belges et congolaises, 4e Edition. (Hasselt)
 Cornet R., 1982, Recueil des dispositions légales et réglementaires régissant les ordres nationaux belges. 2e Ed. N.pl.,  (Brussels)
 Borné A.C., 1985, Distinctions honorifiques de la Belgique, 1830–1985 (Brussels)

External links
 Bibliothèque royale de Belgique (In French)
 Les Ordres Nationaux Belges (In French)
 ARS MORIENDI Notables from Belgian history (In French and Dutch)

King Albert Medal
Awards established in 1930
1930 establishments in Belgium
Prisoner-of-war medals
Belgium in World War I
Military awards and decorations of World War I